Daniel Richard Verity (born 19 April 1980) is an English professional footballer who plays as a central defender.

Career
Verity made one appearance in the Football League for Bradford City during the 1997–98 season, and left the club in May 1999. He later played non-league football for a number of clubs, including Harrogate Town, Bradford Park Avenue, Harrogate Railway Athletic Gresley Rovers, Eccleshill United, and Curzon Ashton, as well as amateur football for Wibsey.

References

1980 births
Living people
English footballers
Association football defenders
Bradford City A.F.C. players
Harrogate Town A.F.C. players
Bradford (Park Avenue) A.F.C. players
Gresley F.C. players
Eccleshill United F.C. players
Harrogate Railway Athletic F.C. players
Curzon Ashton F.C. players
English Football League players